Tyuntyugur is a lake in the Kostanay Region, Kazakhstan.

Tyuntyugur is a steppe lake of the central sector of the Turgay Basin in Karasu District, Kostanay Region. Tyuntyugur is part of the Koibagar-Tyuntyugur Lake System, a  Ramsar site, since 2009.

Geography
Tyuntyugur is an endorheic lake lying  to the east of the larger Koybagar lake. The lake has a regular, roughly oval, shape. Its water is brackish. The smaller and elongated lake Zhanshura lies close to the east. The Tyuntyugur river flows from the south into the southern end of the lake.

The lake is fed by snow and freezes every winter, shrinking significantly in years of drought. Tyuntyugur is surrounded by agricultural fields and its water is used for irrigation, which contributes to increasing siltation.

Fauna
The lake is part of the Koybagar-Tyuntyugur lake group. It is a critical site for nesting, migration and molting of 39 waterfowl and wetland bird species, such as the greylag goose, mallard, gadwall, garganey, common pochard, tufted duck and Eurasian coot. 13 species of birds that visit the lake are listed as critically endangered, such as the siberian crane and the gyrfalcon. 
There are ten different fish species in the lake, including perch and pike.

See also
List of lakes of Kazakhstan
List of Ramsar Wetlands of International Importance

References

External links
Saryarka – Steppe Lakes of Northern Kazakhstan

Lakes of Kazakhstan
Kostanay Region
Endorheic lakes of Asia
Ramsar sites in Kazakhstan